The Zone 6 of Milan (in Italian: Zona 6 di Milano) is one of the 9 administrative zones of Milan, Italy. It corresponds to the south-western zone of the city.

Subdivision
The zone includes the following quarters: Arzaga, Barona, Boffalora, Cascina Bianca, Conchetta, Creta, Foppette, Giambellino-Lorenteggio, Lodovico il Moro, Moncucco, Porta Genova, Porta Ticinese, Ronchetto sul Naviglio, San Cristoforo, Sant'Ambrogio, Teramo, Villa Magentino and Villaggio dei Fiori.

Notable places
Milano Porta Genova railway station
Milano San Cristoforo railway station
Parco Teramo Barona

References

External links

 Zone 6 of Milan (municipal website)

Zones of Milan